In tennis, the 2014 US Open Series (known as Emirates Airline US Open Series for sponsorship reasons) was the eleventh edition of the US Open Series, which included nine hard court tournaments that started on July 21, 2014, in Atlanta and concluded in Winston-Salem for the men and in New Haven for the women on August 23, 2014. This edition consisted of four separate men's tournaments and three women's tournaments, with the Western & Southern Open hosting both a men's and women's event. The series was headlined by two ATP World Tour Masters 1000 and two WTA Premier 5 events. Milos Raonic and Serena Williams were the US Open Series champions in 2014. Serena Williams improved the biggest payout in professional tennis history record which she previously shared with Rafael Nadal. The new record was then set at $4 million.

Point distribution for series events
In order to be included in the final standings and subsequently the bonus prize money, a player needs to have countable results from at least two different tournaments. Starting from the 2014 season, a new rule has been added to double the points of a player who has obtained countable results in at least three tournaments.

The players who finish in the top three in the series can earn up to $1 million in extra prize money at the US Open.

US Open Series standings
The standings include all players who received points in at least two tournaments.

ATP

Notes:
1 – Tours – Number of tournaments in US Open Series in which a player has reached the quarterfinals or better, in 250 and 500 series events, or the Round of 16 in ATP World Tour Masters 1000 events.
2 –  Indicates a player has earned points in at least three Emirates Airline US Open Series events, therefore doubling his point total earned on the Series.

WTA

Notes:
1 – Tours – Number of tournaments in US Open Series in which a player has reached the quarterfinals or better, in Premier events; or the Round of 16 or better in Premier 5 events.
2 –  Indicates a player has earned points in at least three Emirates Airline US Open Series events, therefore doubling her point total earned on the Series.

Bonus Prize Money
Top three players in the 2014 US Open Series will receive bonus prize money, depending on where they finish in the 2014 US Open, according to money schedule below.

2014 Schedule

Week 1

ATP – BB&T Atlanta Open

Main draw finals

Week 2

ATP – Citi Open

Main draw finals

WTA – Bank of West Classic

Main draw finals

Week 3

ATP – Rogers Cup (Toronto)

Main draw finals

WTA – Rogers Cup (Montreal)

Main draw finals

Week 4

ATP – Western & Southern Open

Main draw finals

WTA – Western & Southern Open

Main draw finals

Week 5

ATP – Winston-Salem Open

Main draw finals

WTA – New Haven Open at Yale

Main draw finals

References

External links